"Change Your Life" is the debut single by Japanese singer Anna Tsuchiya, released on 25 January 2006, under the Mad Pray Records label, a subsidiary of Avex. It spent five weeks in the Oricon Style singles chart, reaching number 35 on 2 February 2006. The lyrics were written by Tsuchiya, with the music by Suzanne Standfast, Patrick Standfast and Joa Heimer.

Track listing

References

2006 singles
Anna Tsuchiya songs
2006 songs

pt:Change Your Life